Raphael was an Italian Renaissance painter.

Raphael or Raphaël may also refer to:

Music
Raphael (band), a Japanese rock band active 1997–2001
Raphael (opera), an 1894 opera by Anton Arensky
Raphael (musician), American musician and composer of ambient music
Raphael (singer), Spanish singer
Raphaël Haroche, French singer known by the mononym Raphaël 
The Raphaels, an alternative country music band

Names
Raphael (given name), a name of Hebrew origin
Raphael (surname)
Raphael (footballer) (born 1985), full name Raphael Tessaro Schettino, Brazilian footballer

Religion
Raphael (archangel), an archangel in Judaism, Christianity, and Islam
Raphael I of Constantinople, Ecumenical Patriarch of Constantinople from 1475 to 1476
Raphael II of Constantinople, Ecumenical Patriarch of Constantinople from 1603 to 1607
Raphael of Brooklyn (1860–1915), saint in the Christian Orthodox tradition
Raphael I Bidawid, patriarch of the Chaldean Catholic Church in 1989–2003

Other uses
Raphael (crater), a crater on Mercury
Raphaël (JavaScript library), cross-browser JavaScript library that draws Vector graphics for web sites
Raphael (Teenage Mutant Ninja Turtles), one of the Teenage Mutant Ninja Turtles
Raphael, or The Debauched One, a 1971 French drama film
Raphaels Bank, a UK-based bank
Raphael, codename of the HTC Touch Pro

See also
Acronicta raphael, a moth of the family Noctuidae
Rafael (disambiguation)
Raffle
Raphael Cartoons, seven large cartoons for tapestries, belonging to the British Royal Collection
Raphael catfish (disambiguation)
Raphael House, the first shelter for homeless families in San Francisco, California, founded in 1971
Raphael Rooms, four reception rooms, the public part of the papal apartments in the Palace of the Vatican
Saint Raphael (disambiguation)
Saint-Raphaël (disambiguation)